Nick Winston is an internationally renowned English director and choreographer working in theatre, opera and film. 

Nick's directional debut feature film, Tomorrow Morning, starring Samantha Barks, Ramin Karimloo, Joan Collins, Omid Djalili and Fleur East was released in U.K. cinemas September 2022, distributed by Kaleidoscope Pictures

For television Nick was Stage Director & Choreographer for The Royal Variety Performance at The London Palladium (ITV); choreographer for Miranda Hart: My Such Fun Celebration at The London Palladium (BBC); Sondheim at 80, starring Judi Dench at the Royal Albert Hall (BBC); Shakespeare Live, From The RSC, which received a BAFTA nomination for Live Entertainment (BBC) 

Nick was movement director for Theatre Druid's award-winning production of Waiting For Godot which toured the United States and played at the Lincoln Center in New York. 

In the West End Nick Winston has directed and choreographed the Bonnie & Clyde (musical) (Arts Theatre); CHESS in concert (Theatre Royal, Drury Lane); The Secret Garden (The London Palladium); the critically acclaimed 30th Anniversary production of Fame starring Mica Paris and was Artistic Director for Flashmob starring Kevin Clifton. He choreographed Annie starring Miranda Hart at the Piccadilly Theatre; Loserville at the Garrick Theatre, which received an Olivier Award nomination for Best New Musical and Horrid Henry: Live and Horrid at the Trafalgar Studios.

Other credits as Director & Choreographer include Chess starring Samantha Barks and Ramin Karimloo in Tokyo for which Nick received the Outstanding Choreography Award; Mame starring Tracie Bennett at the Hope Mill Theatre, which received 7 Whatsonstage Award nominations including Best Revival and Best Choreographer;  The first original U.K. revival of Andrew Lloyd Webber's Cats at Kilworth House Theatre, for which he received a Broadway World Award nomination for Best Director;   An American in Paris at the National Theatre, Linz, which received 8 Broadway World Award nominations including Best Director, Best Choreographer and Best Musical;  Guys & Dolls at Kilworth House; the U.K. tour of The Wedding Singer which also played The Troubadour Theatre in London and South Korea, winning the DIMF Award for Best Musical; The World Premier of Club Tropicana for which he also wrote additional material and the highly successful UK tour of Rock of Ages. Winston adapted and directed Shakespeare's A Midsummer Night's Dream at Curve Theatre where he also directed and choreographed Bugsy Malone receiving Broadway World Award nominations for Best Director and Best Choreographer. Winston directed the South African production of Annie, which received 4 Naledi Awards including Best Musical Production and the Broadway World Award for Best Musical Revival.

Other international credits include Kiss Me, Kate at Théâtre du Châtelet in Paris; Sweeney Todd at Palais de la Monnaie in Brussels; Chess in Copenhagen; Flashdance in Switzerland and The Pajama Game in Tokyo.

Winston's work in opera includes Il Turco In Italia for Garsington Opera; Fortunio for Grange Park Opera; Benzin for Chemnitz Opera and the World Premiere of Jonathan Dove's The Adventures of Pinocchio for Opera North and Sadler's Wells.

Winston trained at the Royal Academy of Dance and Laine Theatre Arts. He appeared in the musicals Cats; Beauty & The Beast; Chicago; Fosse; West Side Story; The Boyfriend and Kiss Me, Kate''.

In 2016 Winston was appointed as Associate Artist of Curve Theatre, Leicester. He was nominated for the 2017 Carl Alan Award for his work in Theatre.

Productions

Director and choreographer

Choreographer / Movement Director

Opera

Television and film

Corporate work

External links
 NickWinston.com
 Twitter: 
 https://www.thestage.co.uk/opinion/2016/mark-shenton-10-best-uk-choreographers-right-now/
 http://thetheatricals.blogspot.com/2017/07/an-interview-with-nick-winston.html
 Musical Theatre Interview: 
 Broadway World Interview: 
 IMDB 

English choreographers
British theatre directors
Living people
Year of birth missing (living people)